Snežnik is a wide karst limestone plateau with an area of about  in the Dinaric Alps. It can also be viewed as a southern extension of the Julian Alps. The main part of the plateau is in Slovenia, while the southern part extends into Croatia and connects to the mountain region of Gorski Kotar.

Geology and climate 
It mainly consists of Cretaceous limestone, with Jurassic limestone and a small amount of dolomite at the top. The surface was transformed by ice in the last glacial period. It is generally level, but has numerous dry valleys, sinkholes, about 300 caves and shafts, and cold-air pools with temperatures reaching  in the coldest part of year. The surface is mainly stony, covered with patchy and shallow soil, except for the larger depressions. It is covered by snow in winter. Due to the karst nature of the plateau, there are no surface streams.

The plateau has the following two main peaks:
 Big Mount Snežnik, Slovenia
 Little Mount Snežnik, Slovenia
Note that on the Croatian side of the border, 20 km to the south in the Risnjak National Park of Gorski Kotar, there is a mountain also called Snježnik or Snežnik with an altitude of

Biology 
The vegetation of Snežnik was first studied in the 19th century by Heinrich Freyer, who was later the curator of the Estate Museum of Carniola in Ljubljana. It is Central European, with a large contribution of Southern European species and montane flora above the timberline. In sinkholes, vegetation inversion and a lower timberline (otherwise rare in Slovenia) may be observed. The plateau is covered by beech and fir forests, except for the highest parts covered by dwarf pine and grass. It is a habitat for Edraianthus graminifolius, Arabis scopoliana, Campanula justiniana, Nigritella rubra, Gentiana clusii, Gentiana pannonica, and other flowers. The animals living there include brown bears, wolves, deer, wild boars, and lynx, as well as a number of bird species such as the Ural owl, corn crake, western capercaillie, hazel grouse, and golden eagle.

Hiking 
Big Mount Snežnik is the highest non-Alpine peak of Slovenia and the highest peak along the National Liberation War Courier and Signal Operator Trail. It may be seen from many other parts of Slovenia and is a popular hiking destination. It offers an extensive view and has a toposcope. It is most easily accessible from Sviščaki, a hamlet of the dispersed settlement of Snežnik, on the plateau.

The Drago Karolin Lodge is located just below the peak of Big Mount Snežnik towards the border with Croatia. It was first built as a shelter under the leadership of the professor and mountaineer Drago Karolin, the president of the Snežnik Ilirska Bistrica Mountaineering Club. It was expanded from 1977 to 1994 and named after its first builder.

In popular culture 
In The Glory of the Duchy of Carniola, published in 1689, the polymath Johann Weikhard von Valvasor wrote the following about Snežnik:

References

External links 

 Point Veliki Snežnik (Peak). A map and general information about the access and climbing to Kojca. Pespoti.si. 
 Snežnik. VR panoramas (surround photography) of Snežnik. Boštjan Burger. (Rich media - may be viewed with QuickTime).

Dinaric Alps
Nature reserves in Slovenia
Karst plateaus of Slovenia
Mountains of Inner Carniola
Plateaus of Inner Carniola
Two-thousanders of Slovenia